Chinese German or German Chinese may be:
Of or relating to Sino-German relations
Chinese people in Germany
Chinese as a foreign language in Germany
Germans in China
Kiautschou Bay concession
Eurasian (mixed ancestry) people of Chinese and German descent